Aeaun is a small island in the Russell Islands, Solomon Islands; it is located in the Central Province. It is the northernmost islet of the Russel Islands, located on the coral reef north of the group's main island Pavuvu.

Islands of the Solomon Islands